Marathrum is a genus of flowering plants belonging to the family Podostemaceae.

Its native range is Mexico to Tropical America.

Description 
Small to medium-sized stemless herbs known to be attached to roots in only a few species, the sterile plants often larger and coarser than the fertile, with an irregular, sometimes branched, adhesive base. Leaves either distichous or inserted along the margin of the thalloid base, repeatedly pinnate with all the pinnae alter- nate or slightly opposite, or entire with a few lobes along the margin; petiole sometimes fleshy, often dilated at the base. Flowers at first enclosed in a persistent, membranaceous spathe which splits irregularly at the tip, 1 to many, solitary or fascicled between the leaf-bases; pedicel scarcely enlarged at the tip in some species, in others abruptly enlarged; tepals 3-25 in a complete or incomplete whorl, in- conspicuous, squamiform to filiform, inserted on the margin of the receptacle in species with enlarged pedicels, but sometimes inserted at different levels in species with normal or scarcely enlarged pedicels; stamens 2-25, in a complete or incom- plete whorl (the latter unknown in Panamanian species), rarely united at the base, the filaments lanceolate, 3-angled at the base, sometimes branched, nerved, the anthers sagittate, introrse; pollen ellipsoidal to subglobose, 3-sulcate; ovary 2- celled, ellipsoidal, attenuate at the base, with 2 equal carpels, 8-ribbed; placenta of the same shape as the ovary, with many ovules; styles 2, filiform or cylindric, cohering at the base or very rarely free, often emarginate. Fruit with 2 equal, persistent, 5-ribbed valves.

Species
Species:

Marathrum azarensis 
Marathrum capillaceum 
Marathrum cubanum 
Marathrum foeniculaceum 
Marathrum pauciflorum 
Marathrum plumosum 
Marathrum rubrum 
Marathrum schiedeanum 
Marathrum striatifolium 
Marathrum tenue 
Marathrum trichophorum 
Marathrum utile

References

Podostemaceae
Malpighiales genera